Cydonia: Mars - The First Manned Mission (aka Lightbringer: The Next Giant Leap for Mankind) is a 1998 adventure video game, and the premiere title for developer Aneiva Interactive.

Plot 
In the wake of Earth's imminent destruction, the player is part of a re-population mission to Mars to save the human race.

Gameplay 
Gameplay is similar to The 7th Guest and The 11th Hour, whereby players must complete puzzles to unlock new locations to explore.

Release
In October 1999, Cydonia was re-released under the name Lightbringer by its publisher DreamCatcher Interactive. According to Ray Ivey of Adventure Gamers, the decision was made for "legal and marketing reasons", and he noted that the marketing team saw the "previous name and package presentation ... [as looking] more like a reference title than an adventure game." The new edition was released on October 29.

Critical reception 

Rich Rouse of IGN said the game would only appeal to hardcore fans of the adventure genre. Randy Sluganski of Just Adventure deemed it an "excellent first effort", and praised it for successfully merging entertainment and education. PC Gamer'''s Stephen Poole criticised the lackluster characters, plot, and graphics. Heidi Fournier of Adventure Gamers'' thought it was an interesting entry in the adventure game genre that would also have crossover appeal to fantasy fans.

References

External links
Official site (archived)

1998 video games
Adventure games
Video games developed in the United States
Windows games
Windows-only games